The Mercedes-Benz CLK DTM is a 2-door DTM touring car constructed by the German car manufacturer Mercedes-Benz, that debuted in the 2000 DTM season, and competed until the end of the 2003 season. It was based on the standard Mercedes-Benz CLK-Class (C208) road car then later the CLK-Class (C209).

History 
For the 2000 DTM season, Mercedes-Benz committed to entering eight cars split between four cars from the Works HWA Team, and two cars each from the semi-Works Persson and Rosberg outfits. HWA, in turn, sub-divided its operations into two parallel squads. The first ran two D2 Telekom-sponsored cars for  Bernd Schneider and Thomas Jäger, the second fielding two Warsteiner-backed cars for Klaus Ludwig, and Marcel Fässler.

In March 2002, Mercedes-Benz announced a revised version of the CLK DTM now based on the CLK-Class (C209), at the Geneva Motor Show with Bernd Schneider and Jean Alesi. The car won the 2003 DTM season.

Gallery

References

External links
Mercedes-Benz Motorsport website

CLK DTM
Deutsche Tourenwagen Masters cars